In enzymology, a benzophenone synthase is an enzyme that catalyzes the chemical reaction

3 malonyl-CoA + 3-hydroxybenzoyl-CoA  4 CoA + 2,3',4,6-tetrahydroxybenzophenone + 3 CO2

Thus, the two substrates of this enzyme are malonyl-CoA and 3-hydroxybenzoyl-CoA, whereas its 3 products are CoA, 2,3',4,6-tetrahydroxybenzophenone, and CO2.

This enzyme belongs to the family of transferases, specifically those acyltransferases transferring groups other than aminoacyl groups.  The systematic name of this enzyme class is malonyl-CoA:3-hydroxybenzoyl-CoA malonyltransferase.

References 

 

EC 2.3.1
Enzymes of unknown structure